The women's 4×100 metre freestyle relay was a swimming event held as part of the swimming at the 1912 Summer Olympics programme. It was the first appearance of the event, which along with the individual 100 metre freestyle marked the debut of women's Olympic swimming.

Four teams entered the event: Australasia, whose swimmers finished first and second in the individual 100m freestyle, did not have any other women present to make a relay team, and a request for their swimmers to swim two legs each was rejected.

Great Britain, with two of the individual finalists, won the gold. Germany took silver and Austria won bronze over the host Swedes. The competition was held on Monday July 15, 1912.

Sixteen swimmers from four nations competed.

Records

There were no standing world and Olympic records (in minutes) prior to the 1912 Summer Olympics.

Therefore, the time set by the British team was also the first official world record.

Results

Final

References

 
 

Swimming at the 1912 Summer Olympics
1912 in women's swimming
Women's events at the 1912 Summer Olympics